Koko Taylor (born Cora Anna Walton, September 28, 1928 – June 3, 2009) was an American singer whose style encompassed Chicago blues, electric blues, rhythm and blues and soul blues. Sometimes called "The Queen of the Blues", she was known for her rough, powerful vocals.

Life and career
Born on a farm near Memphis, Tennessee, Taylor was the daughter of a sharecropper. She left Tennessee for Chicago in 1952 with her husband, Robert "Pops" Taylor, a truck driver. In the late 1950s, she began singing in blues clubs in Chicago. She was spotted by Willie Dixon in 1962, and this led to more opportunities for performing and her first recordings. In 1963 she had a single on USA Records, and in 1964 a cut on a Chicago blues collection on Spivey Records, called Chicago Blues. In 1964 Dixon brought Taylor to Checker Records, a subsidiary label of Chess Records, for which she recorded "Wang Dang Doodle", a song written by Dixon and recorded by Howlin' Wolf five years earlier. The record became a hit, reaching number four on the R&B chart and number 58 on the pop chart in 1966, and selling a million copies. She recorded several versions of the song over the years, including a live rendition at the 1967 American Folk Blues Festival, with the harmonica player Little Walter and the guitarist Hound Dog Taylor. Her subsequent recordings, both original songs and covers, did not achieve as much success on the charts.

Taylor became better known by touring in the United States in the late 1960s and early 1970s, and she became accessible to a wider record-buying public when she signed a recording contract with Alligator Records in 1975. She recorded nine albums for Alligator, eight of which were nominated for Grammy awards, and came to dominate ranks of female blues singers, winning twenty-nine W. C. Handy/Blues Music Awards.

She survived a near-fatal car crash in 1989. In the 1990s, she appeared in the films Blues Brothers 2000 and Wild at Heart. She opened a blues club on Division Street in Chicago in 1994, which relocated to Wabash Avenue, in Chicago's South Loop, in 2000 (the club is now closed).

In 2003, she appeared as a guest with Taj Mahal in an episode of the television series Arthur. In 2009, she performed with Umphrey's McGee at the band's New Year's Eve concert at the Auditorium Theater, in Chicago.

Taylor influenced Bonnie Raitt, Shemekia Copeland, Janis Joplin, Shannon Curfman, and Susan Tedeschi.

In her later years, she performed over 70 concerts a year and resided just south of Chicago, in Country Club Hills, Illinois.

Taylor's final performance was at the Blues Music Awards, on May 7, 2009. She suffered complications from surgery for gastrointestinal bleeding on May 19 and died on June 3.

Awards
Grammy Award for Best Traditional Blues Album, 1985
Howlin' Wolf Award, 1996
Blues Hall of Fame, inducted 1997
Blues Foundation Lifetime Achievement Award, 1999
NEA National Heritage Fellowship, 2004
Blues Music Award (formerly the W. C. Handy Award), 32 nominations with 29 wins in the following categories:
Entertainer of the Year (1985)
Female Artist (1981, 1995)
Song of the Year (2008)
Traditional Blues Album (2008)
Traditional Blues Female Artist (1992, 1993, 1999–2005, 2008, 2009)
Vocalist of the Year (1985)
7th Annual Independent Music Awards for Best Blues Album, 2008

Discography
"Love You Like a Woman", November 30, 1968 (Charly Records) 
Koko Taylor, 1969 (MCA/Chess Records)
Basic Soul, 1972 (Chess)
South Side Lady, 1973 (Black and Blue Records)
I Got What It Takes, 1975 (Alligator Records)
Southside Baby, 1975 (Black & Blue)
The Earthshaker, 1978 (Alligator)
From the Heart of a Woman, 1981 (Alligator)
Queen of the Blues, 1985 (Alligator)
Live from Chicago: An Audience with the Queen, 1987 (Alligator)
Jump for Joy, 1990 (Alligator)
Wang Dang Doodle, 1991 (Huub Records)
Force of Nature, 1993 (Alligator)
Royal Blue, 2000 (Alligator)
Old School, 2007 (Alligator)

See also
 Chicago Blues Festival

References

External links
 Official website (redirected to the Koko's page at Alligator Records website)
 
 
 
 Co-host of "Blues you can use", FM radio station WGVE 88.7, Gary, Indiana
 "Queen of the Blues: Koko Taylor Talks About Her Subjects", interview by James Plath, 1994
 Interview with Koko Taylor on Centerstage Chicago (June 2007)
 Wild Women Don't Have the Blues features interviews with Koko Taylor
 Hoekstra, Dave. "Chicago legend and 'Queen of the Blues' Koko Taylor dead at 80," Chicago Sun-Times, Wednesday, June 3, 2009.
 Koko Taylor - Daily Telegraph obituary
 Koko Taylor: The Life of a Blues Legend

1928 births
2009 deaths
American blues singers
20th-century African-American women singers
American rhythm and blues singers
Grammy Award winners
National Heritage Fellowship winners
Singers from Chicago
People from Shelby County, Tennessee
Musicians from Memphis, Tennessee
Blues musicians from Tennessee
Chicago blues musicians
Independent Music Awards winners
Alligator Records artists
Chess Records artists
Checker Records artists
20th-century American singers
People from Country Club Hills, Illinois
People from Lake County, Illinois
20th-century American women singers
21st-century African-American people
21st-century African-American women